Hrenca is a settlement east of Maribor in northeastern Slovenia. It belongs to the City Municipality of Maribor.

References

External links
Hrenca on Geopedia

Populated places in the City Municipality of Maribor